Rheiformes is an order that contains the family Rheidae (rheas). It is in the infraclass Paleognathae, which contains all ratites. Extant members are found in South America. While the IOC World Bird List and the Clements Checklist categorise Rheiformes as its own order, the BirdLife Data Zone includes rheas, along with ostriches, tinamous, cassowaries, emu, and kiwis, in the order Struthioniformes. Of the two extant species of rheas recognized by the IUCN Red List, Rhea americana is listed as near threatened, while Rhea pennata is listed as least concern. From 2014 to 2022, the IUCN recognised Rhea tarapacensis as a separate species, and listed it as near threatened in its last assessment in 2020; in 2022, it was again recognised as a subspecies of R. pennata.

References 

Bird orders
Paleocene taxonomic orders
Eocene taxonomic orders
Oligocene taxonomic orders
Miocene taxonomic orders
Pliocene taxonomic orders
Pleistocene taxonomic orders
Holocene taxonomic orders
Notopalaeognathae